The Magyar Kupa Final was the final match of the 2012–13 Magyar Kupa, played between Debrecen and Győr.

Route to the final

Match

References

External links
 Official site 

2013
Debreceni VSC matches
Győri ETO FC matches